Following is a list of the current and former destinations served by Turkmenistan Airlines, .

List

References

Lists of airline destinations